The Genesee County C League was a high school sport league in Genesee County Michigan that operated in the mid-20th century with Class C size schools.

References 

Michigan high school sports conferences